Vaiņode (also somewhere written as Vainodo, Vainede, Vaynede, Vaynodo, and Toyvanede) is a former USSR air base in Latvia, located  south of Skrunda. It was abandoned in 1993. It is only  from the border with Lithuania.

History 
After the war, they were dismantled and parts of them reused as top cover of Riga Central Market's pavilion buildings. They are still in use today.

Vaiņode was home to the 54th Guards Fighter Aviation Regiment (54 Gv IAP), in 1967 flying some of the first Sukhoi Su-15 (ASCC: Flagon) aircraft ever fielded.  These planes were upgraded to Sukhoi Su-27 (ASCC: Flanker) aircraft in the 1980s, and there is some evidence that Mikoyan-Gurevich MiG-23 (ASCC: Flogger) aircraft were flown. The 54th Regiment was withdrawn to Savasleyka in the Moscow Military District after 1990.

The 54th Guards IAP PVO was activated in May 1941 as the 237th Fighter Aviation Regiment (IAP) equipped with the Yakovlev Yak-1. On 3 February 1943 it became the 54th Guards IAP; "Kerch" designation from Apr 1944; 1944 equipped with Bell P-39 Airacobra, as part of the 1st Guards IAD; reequipped with Su-15 in 1967, Su-15TM from the 2nd half of the 1970s, and Su-27 from the 2nd half of the 1980s.

Today
The site has been derelict since Latvian independence from the USSR in 1991. Part of the air base was demolished between 1995 and 1997. Some of the concrete plates were used to improve the infrastructure in Liepāja Port. Most of the area is a nature reserve.

References

External links
 Photographs of the site in 2007

Latvian airbases
Soviet Air Force bases
Soviet Air Defence Force bases
South Kurzeme Municipality
Courland